The 9th Illinois Infantry Regiment was an infantry regiment that served in the Union Army during the American Civil War.

History

Initial 3 month service
Shortly after the Battle of Fort Sumter, President Lincoln called for 75,000 volunteers. They were to serve for three months. The state of Illinois put out a call to form units. Six companies came from St. Clair County. Madison County sent three companies. Montgomery county sent one company. All nine companies met at Springfield, Illinois, on 23 April 1861. There they were mustered in by Captain John Pope on April 26th, 1861 and formed into the 9th Regiment, Illinois, volunteer infantry. There were rumors that the Confederates intended to invade at Cairo, Illinois. In response, orders were issued for the 9th Infantry to occupy Cairo. The regiment was moved to Cairo for garrison duty near the Mississippi River until July, 1861. They arrived and set up camp on 1 May 1861. It was then attached to Prentiss' Brigade. Companies "C" and "H" formed part of an expedition from Cairo to Little River on June 22nd and 23rd. By the time the regiment was mustered out on July 26th, 1861, they had lost nine to disease.

3 year service
Most of the men reenlisted for three years. In September the regiment moved to Paducah, Kentucky. There they did little more than drill practice. On 15 February 1862 they joined the fighting at the Battle of Fort Donelson. Their losses included 36 killed and 165 wounded, out of a total strength of 600. After the Confederates surrendered, they were transported by riverboats up the Tennessee River. They left the boats at Pittsburg Landing, Tennessee and camped nearby. On 6 April 1862 they woke up to the sound of cannons. While they were waiting to join the battle, new orders were given. They were ordered to exchange their gray coats for Union blue. This way they would not be mistaken for Confederate troops. They then joined the battle of Shiloh. They fought most of the day. At Shiloh the 9th Illinois had the highest casualties of any Illinois unit. They lost 366 of their comrades They also fought at the Second Battle of Corinth. The regiment was changed to the 9th Illinois Mounted Infantry Regiment on March 15, 1863. The regiment fought in the Battle of Athens in 1864. On 9 July 1865 the 9th Illinois Infantry was mustered out (released from military service) at Louisville, Kentucky.

Total strength and casualties
The regiment suffered 5 officers and 211 recruited men killed in action or mortally wounded. 1 officer and 200 enlisted men died of disease. In total there were 417 casualties (persons killed or wounded).

Uniforms 
The 9th Illinois volunteers, along with the 8th, 11th, and 12th, all wore gray coats trimmed in blue. They also wore Zouave caps. In 1862, they were fitted with the standard Union blue uniforms. Most of the Illinois infantry regiments were issued the Springfield Model 1861 muskets.

Commanders
 Colonel Augustus Mersy - Mustered out with the regiment.

See also
 9th Illinois Cavalry Regiment
 List of Illinois Civil War units

Notes

References

Bibliography 
 Dyer, Frederick H. (1959). A Compendium of the War of the Rebellion. New York and London. Thomas Yoseloff, Publisher. .

External links
 The Civil War Archive

Units and formations of the Union Army from Illinois
1861 establishments in Illinois
Military units and formations established in 1861
Military units and formations disestablished in 1865